Tuscany is the 12th album by the English progressive rock band Renaissance, released in 2001. After a lengthy hiatus, original members Annie Haslam, Michael Dunford, Terence Sullivan and John Tout came together to record a new album, assisted by Roy Wood; Tout was unavailable for the later sessions and was replaced by Mickey Simmonds.

Although the album led to one London date on 9 March 2001 followed by a short tour of Japan, with Haslam, Dunford, Sullivan and Simmonds augmented by Rave Tesar (keyboards) and David J. Keyes (bass, vocals), Annie Haslam subsequently announced that the band was again disbanding.

Track listing

Personnel

Renaissance
Annie Haslam - lead and backing vocals, producer
Michael Dunford - guitars, producer
Terence Sullivan - drums, percussion
Mickey Simmonds - keyboards and orchestral arrangements

Guest musicians
John Tout - piano and harpsichord on track 2, keyboards on track 8
Roy Wood - bass on tracks 2 and 3, keyboards and orchestral arrangements on track 3, backing vocals on track 8, percussion on track 9, producer on tracks 5 and 9
Alex Caird - bass guitar

Production
Rob Williams, David Woolgar - engineers and mixing
David Ivory & Cheek - mastering at Sigma Sound Services, Philadelphia, PA
Hal Jay Greene, Jim Wood - executive producers

References

2001 albums
Renaissance (band) albums
EMI Records albums